Seabrook is a town in Rockingham County, New Hampshire, United States. The population was 8,401 at the 2020 census. Located at the southern end of the coast of New Hampshire on the border with Massachusetts, Seabrook is noted as the location of the Seabrook Station Nuclear Power Plant, the third-most recently constructed nuclear power plant in the United States.

Seabrook is the first town one encounters when entering New Hampshire northbound on I–95.

Geography
The census-designated place of Seabrook Beach occupies the eastern end of the town, along the Atlantic Ocean. Seabrook is drained by the Blackwater, the Browns River, and the Hampton Falls River, all of which drain north or east to Hampton Harbor, an inlet to the Atlantic Ocean. The southwest corner of the town drains via Lucy Brook to the Back River in Massachusetts, part of the Merrimack River watershed.

Adjacent municipalities
 Hampton Falls, New Hampshire (north)
 Hampton, New Hampshire (northeast)
 Salisbury, Massachusetts (south)
 Amesbury, Massachusetts (southwest at one point)
 South Hampton, New Hampshire (west)
 Kensington, New Hampshire (northwest)

Demographics

As of the 2010 census, there were 8,693 people, 3,706 households and 2,276 families living in the town. The population density was 977 per square mile (380/km). There were 4,544 housing units in the town, 838 of which (18.4%) were vacant. 512 of the vacant units were for seasonal or recreational use. The racial makeup of the town was 96.3% White, 0.5% African American, 0.1% Native American, 1.1% Asian, 0.6% some other race, and 1.4% from two or more races. Hispanic or Latino of any race were 1.4% of the population.

Of the 3,706 households in the town, 25.4% had children under the age of 18 living with them, 45.0% were headed by married couples living together, 11.1% had a female householder with no husband present, and 38.6% were non-families. 30.1% of all households were made up of individuals, and 11.7% were someone living alone who was 65 years of age or older. The average household size was 2.34, and the average family size was 2.90.

The town's age distribution was 18.7% under the age of 18, 7.8% from 18 to 24, 24.2% from 25 to 44, 31.7% from 45 to 64, and 17.5% who were 65 years of age or older. The median age was 44.6 years. For every 100 females, there were 99.0 males. For every 100 females age 18 and over, there were 98.4 males.

For the period 2014–2018, the estimated median household income was $67,430, and the median family income was $78,769. Male full-time workers had a median income of $53,315 versus $41,354 for females. The per capita income for the town was $35,356.

Sites of interest 
 Seabrook Beach, a census-designated place
 Seabrook Greyhound Park, which ended live racing in 2009, and now operates as a casino-like facility under a different name
 Seabrook Station Nuclear Power Plant, in operation since 1990

Fireworks 
Due to its location along I-95 on the Massachusetts-New Hampshire border, Seabrook has many fireworks and fireworks supply stores; consumer fireworks are legal in New Hampshire, whereas in Massachusetts, they are illegal and cannot be purchased. This creates a demand for fireworks in border towns like Seabrook, to the point where Massachusetts State Police have entered New Hampshire in efforts to crack down on transport of fireworks back over the border.

Notable people 

 Alvah Augustus Eaton (1865–1908), botanist
 Pamela Gidley (1965–2018), actress
 Scotty Lago (born 1987), bronze medalist snowboarder (2010 Olympics)
 Jackson Nicoll (born 2003), child actor
 Meshech Weare (1713–1786), New Hampshire's first president (now known as governor)

References

External links
 
 Seabrook Library
 New Hampshire Economic and Labor Market Information Bureau Profile

 
Towns in Rockingham County, New Hampshire
Towns in New Hampshire
Populated coastal places in New Hampshire